

National team

National student team
7th World University Futsal Championship 2000 in João Pessoa, Brasil

Intercontinental Futsal Cup

Futsal European Clubs Championship

Top League

Final standings
9th Russian futsal championship 2000/2001

Promotion tournament

National Cup

Final Four

First League. Division A

First League. Division B

Final stage

Women's League
9th Russian women futsal championship 2000/2001

Women's National Cup

References

Russia
Seasons in Russian futsal
futsal
futsal